Stenungsön is an island and a locality situated in Stenungsund Municipality, Västra Götaland County, Sweden with 264 inhabitants in 2010. Stenungsön is separate from the main town Stenungsund by a narrow strait. The distance to central Gothenburg is about 47 kilometers.

References

External links 
stenungson.se Official website (in Swedish)

Populated places in Västra Götaland County
Populated places in Stenungsund Municipality